Chloroclystis mariae is a moth in the family Geometridae. It is found on Fiji.

References
Robinson, G.S., 1975. Macrolepidoptera of Fiji and Rotuma: a taxonomic and geographic study. Farringdon. 361 pp.

External links

Moths described in 1975
mariae
Moths of Fiji
Endemic fauna of Fiji